Colegio Humboldt may refer to the following German international schools in Latin America:
Colegio Humboldt, Caracas
Asociación de Educación y Cultura “Alejandro von Humboldt” Colegio Alemán de Guatemala
Colegio Alemán Humboldt Guayaquil
Colegio Peruano Alemán Alexander von Humboldt (Lima)
Colegio Alemán Alexander von Humboldt (Greater Mexico City)
Colegio Humboldt Puebla
Colegio Humboldt (Costa Rica) (San Jose)
Colégio Humboldt São Paulo